Ernest Jacquet (September 25, 1886 – September 30, 1969) was a Swiss ice hockey player who competed in the 1924 Winter Olympics.

In 1924 he participated with the Swiss ice hockey team in the Winter Olympics tournament.

See also
 List of Olympic men's ice hockey players for Switzerland

References

External links
 
 
 

1886 births
1969 deaths
Ice hockey players at the 1924 Winter Olympics
Olympic ice hockey players of Switzerland
Swiss ice hockey right wingers